The 2021–22 Pro50 Championship was the twentieth edition of the Pro50 Championship, a List A cricket tournament that was played in Zimbabwe. It started on 11 November 2021, with five teams taking part. Rhinos were the defending champions.

The match between Eagles and Mountaineers, scheduled to be played on 9 December 2021, was postponed after four players tested positive for COVID-19. Mountaineers won their penultimate group match, to join Rocks in the final of the tournament. In the final, Mountaineers beat Rocks by 71 runs to win the tournament.

Points table

 Advanced to the Final

Fixtures

Round-robin

Final

References

External links
 Series home at ESPN Cricinfo

2021 in Zimbabwean cricket
2022 in Zimbabwean cricket
Pro50 Championship